Ashlea Fey (born 14 May 1992) is an Australian field hockey player.

Fey was born on the Sunshine Coast, Queensland, and made her senior international debut in the Trans-Tasman Trophy against New Zealand in November 2016.

Fey is also a prominent player in the Australian women's national indoor team, playing in the 2015 Women's Indoor Hockey World Cup in Leipzig, Germany, where the team finished 8th.

References

External links

1992 births
Living people
Australian female field hockey players
Sportswomen from Queensland
Commonwealth Games medallists in field hockey
Commonwealth Games silver medallists for Australia
Field hockey players at the 2018 Commonwealth Games
20th-century Australian women
21st-century Australian women
Medallists at the 2018 Commonwealth Games